The 2022 UEFA Women's Under-17 Championship (also known as UEFA Women's Under-17 Euro 2022) was the 13th edition of the UEFA Women's Under-17 Championship, the annual international youth football championship organised by UEFA for the women's under-17 national teams of Europe. Bosnia and Herzegovina hosted the tournament. A total of eight teams played in the tournament. Players born on or after 1 January 2005 were eligible to participate.

Same as previous editions held in even-numbered years, the tournament acted as the UEFA qualifiers for the FIFA U-17 Women's World Cup. The top three teams of the tournament qualified for the 2022 FIFA U-17 Women's World Cup in India as the UEFA representatives.

Germany were the defending champions, having won the last tournament held in 2019, with the 2020 and 2021 editions cancelled due to the COVID-19 pandemic in Europe. In the final, defending champions, Germany won their eighth title by defeating Spain 2–2 (3–2 after penalties).

Host selection
The timeline of host selection was as follows:
11 January 2019: bidding procedure launched
28 February 2019: deadline to express interest
27 March 2019: Announcement by UEFA that declaration of interest were received from 17 member associations to host one of the UEFA national team youth final tournaments (UEFA European Under-19 Championship, UEFA Women's Under-19 Championship, UEFA European Under-17 Championship, UEFA Women's Under-17 Championship) in 2021 and 2022 (although it was not specified which association were interested in which tournament)
28 June 2019: Submission of bid dossiers
24 September 2019: Selection of successful host associations by the UEFA Executive Committee at its meeting in Ljubljana

For the UEFA European Women's Under-17 Championship final tournaments of 2021 and 2022, the Faroe Islands and Bosnia and Herzegovina were selected as hosts respectively.

Qualification

The UEFA Executive Committee approved on 18 June 2020 a new qualifying format for the Women's Under-17 and Under-19 Championship starting from 2022. The qualifying competition will be played in two rounds, with teams divided into two leagues, and promotion and relegation between leagues after each round similar to the UEFA Nations League.

A record total of 49 (out of 55) UEFA nations entered the qualifying competition, with the hosts Bosnia and Herzegovina also competing despite already qualifying automatically, and seven teams will qualify for the final tournament at the end of round 2 to join the hosts. The draw for round 1 was held on 11 March 2021, 13:30 CET (UTC+1), at the UEFA headquarters in Nyon, Switzerland.

Qualified teams
The following teams qualified for the final tournament.

1 Bold indicates champions for that year. Italic indicates hosts for that year.

Final draw
The final draw was held on 5 April 2022, 18:00 CET, at Hotel Hills in Sarajevo, Bosnia and Herzegovina. The eight teams were drawn into two groups of four teams. There were no seeding, except that the hosts Bosnia and Herzegovina were assigned to position A1 in the draw.

Venues

Squads

Each national team have to submit a squad of 20 players, two of whom had to be goalkeepers (Regulations Article 43.01).

Group stage
The group winners and runners-up advanced to the semi-finals.

Tiebreakers
In the group stage, teams were ranked according to points (3 points for a win, 1 point for a draw, 0 points for a loss), and if tied on points, the following tiebreaking criteria were applied, in the order given, to determine the rankings (Regulations Articles 20.01 and 20.02):
Points in head-to-head matches among tied teams;
Goal difference in head-to-head matches among tied teams;
Goals scored in head-to-head matches among tied teams;
If more than two teams were tied, and after applying all head-to-head criteria above, a subset of teams were still tied, all head-to-head criteria above were reapplied exclusively to that subset of teams;
Goal difference in all group matches;
Goals scored in all group matches;
Penalty shoot-out if only two teams had the same number of points, and they met in the last round of the group and were tied after applying all criteria above (not used if more than two teams had the same number of points, or if their rankings were not relevant for qualification for the next stage);
Disciplinary points (red card = 3 points, yellow card = 1 point, expulsion for two yellow cards in one match = 3 points);
Higher position in the qualification round 2 league ranking

All times are local, CEST (UTC+2).

Group A

Group B

Knockout stage
In the knockout stage, penalty shoot-out was used to decide the winner if necessary (no extra time was played).

Bracket

Semi-finals
The winners qualified for the 2022 FIFA U-17 Women's World Cup. The losers entered the FIFA U-17 Women's World Cup play-off.

Third place play-off
The winner qualified for the 2022 FIFA U-17 Women's World Cup.

Final

Goalscorers

Qualified teams for FIFA U-17 Women's World Cup
The following three teams from UEFA qualified for the 2022 FIFA U-17 Women's World Cup.

1 Bold indicates champions for that year. Italic indicates hosts for that year.

References

External links

2022
Women's Under-17 Championship
2022 Uefa Women's Under-17 Championship

2022 in women's association football
2022 in youth association football
2022 FIFA U-17 Women's World Cup qualification
UEFA